The Iglesia ni Cristo is noted for its role in elections in the Philippines.

Bloc voting
The Iglesia ni Cristo is known for its practice of bloc voting during elections. The INC is known for issuing strict directives to vote for certain candidates endorsed by the church under the tenet of obedience or risk expulsion. INC spokesperson Edwil Zabala has stressed the importance of unity of its members with the church leadership.As a consequence, candidates often attempt to secure endorsement from the INC.

According to pollster, Mahar Mangahas the INC usually announces its endorsements around a week before election day when "when the rankings of the candidates in the polls have stabilized" and concludes that candidates' ranking in opinion polls are a factor on how the INC chooses candidates to support.

Endorsements
The following is the list of candidates who have been endorsed by the Iglesia ni Cristo. The list is limited to candidates running for president, vice president, and senators.

President

Vice President

Senators

References

Christianity and politics
Religion and politics
Elections in the Philippines